José Ramón Gallego Souto (born 7 August 1959) is a Spanish retired footballer who played as a midfielder.

His entire professional career was spent with Athletic Bilbao, for which he played 11 seasons in La Liga with competitive totals of 330 matches and 18 goals.

Club career
Born in Durango, Biscay, Gallego started playing in 1978 with local amateurs SCD Durango. After one year, he joined Basque giants Athletic Bilbao, initially being assigned to the reserves in Segunda División B.

Gallego made his La Liga debut on 30 March 1980, coming on as a second-half substitute in a 0–0 away draw against RCD Español. He appeared in a further six league games during the season. After a loan to third-tier Córdoba CF, he returned to the San Mamés Stadium and went on to be a first-team regular over the following eight years.

Gallego contributed a total of 57 matches and two goals as his main club won back-to-back national championships (including the double in 1983–84). He ended his career in 1992 at the age of 32, with neighbouring Deportivo Alavés in division three.

Honours

Club
Athletic Bilbao
La Liga: 1982–83, 1983–84
Copa del Rey: 1983–84
Supercopa de España: 1984

International
Spain U21
UEFA European Under-21 Championship: 1986

References

External links

1959 births
Living people
People from Durango, Biscay
Spanish footballers
Footballers from the Basque Country (autonomous community)
Association football midfielders
La Liga players
Segunda División B players
Bilbao Athletic footballers
Athletic Bilbao footballers
Córdoba CF players
Deportivo Alavés players
Spain under-21 international footballers
Sportspeople from Biscay